Karl Barl (born 3 March 1881, date of death unknown) was an Austrian wrestler. He competed in the light heavyweight event at the 1912 Summer Olympics.

References

External links
 

1881 births
Year of death missing
Olympic wrestlers of Austria
Wrestlers at the 1912 Summer Olympics
Austrian male sport wrestlers
Sportspeople from Lower Austria